Lennart Svensson (born 18 November 1934) is a Swedish former footballer who played his entire career at Malmö FF as a midfielder.

He is known as "Lill-Kick" after his father, Erik "Kick" Svensson (1903–1942), who made nearly 100 appearances for Malmö FF as a forward.

References

External links

1934 births
Association football midfielders
Swedish footballers
Sweden international footballers
Allsvenskan players
Malmö FF players
Living people